Chang-hoon is a Korean male given name.

People with this name include:
Lee Chang-hoon (athlete) (1935–2004), Korean long-distance runner
Lee Chang-hoon (actor) (born 1966), South Korean actor
Lee Chang-hoon (footballer) (born 1986), South Korean football player
Kim Chang-hoon (born 1987), South Korean football player 
Kim Chang-hun (born 1990), South Korean football player

Fictional characters with this name include:
Chang-hoon, in 2002 South Korean film Phone
Lee Chang-hoon, in 2013 South Korean television series You're the Best, Lee Soon-shin

See also
List of Korean given names

Korean masculine given names